Lagenophora gracilis is a small plant in the family Asteraceae, found in eastern Australia, and in tropical Asia. Common names include slender bottle-daisy and slender lagenophora. The habitat is the floor of Eucalyptus forests, often in moist situations.

References

External links
GBIF: Lagenophora gracilis (Currently no georeferenced Sri Lankan and Indian specimens in GBIF.)

gracilis
Flora of New South Wales
Flora of Victoria (Australia)
Flora of Tasmania
Flora of Queensland
Flora of Papua New Guinea
Plants described in 1845
Taxa named by Joachim Steetz